Emich is a surname of Germanic origin, see "Emich" for more. Notable people with this surname include:

Friedrich Emich (1860–1940), Austrian chemist
Kerstin Emich (born 1962), German judoka
Matthias Emich (died 1480), Roman Catholic prelate

See also

German-language surnames